Van der Vlist Transport group is an abnormal load specialist, based in Groot-Ammers, Netherlands.

History 
Van der Vlist was founded in 1930 in Hoogblokland as a road haulage company, building materials, livestock and straw. In the 1960s they began to develop low bed trailers, which led to a focus on heavy transport as they expanded into the 1990s.

From 1990 Van der Vlist began to further expand, moving to their current facility at Groot-Ammers, acquiring their own terminal at Moerdijk, developing multimodal links, creating storage facilities and developing Technical Services.

After this development, Van der Vlist began the 21st Century by developing its project management service, and gaining accreditations.
Nowadays they are specialists in transporting various types of machinery across Europe.

Offices 
Netherlands – Groot-Ammers, Moerdijk, Assen (Holtrop-Van der Vlist) and Rijssen (ZTT)

Belgium – Zeebrugge
United Kingdom – Hull
Poland – Poznan

Russia – St. Petersburg
Spain - Barcelona

Germany - Schermbeck

References

External links
 

Transport companies of the Netherlands
Transport companies established in 1930
1930 establishments in the Netherlands